Scrambled Eggs Super! is a 1953 book by American children's author Dr. Seuss. The story is told from the point of view of a boy named Peter T. Hooper, who makes scrambled eggs prepared from eggs belonging to various exotic birds.

Plot
At the beginning of the story, Peter T. Hooper brags to his sister, Liz, in his mother's kitchen about what a good cook he is. He tells the story of how, when he became fed up with the taste of regular scrambled eggs using hen's eggs, he decided to scramble eggs from other birds. He tells of how he travelled great distances and discovered a variety of exotic birds and their eggs.

He explains his criteria for choosing some eggs, because of their sweetness, and avoiding others. He takes the eggs home but decides that he still needs more, and he calls on the help of some of his friends from around the world, including a "fellow named Ali". After each bird Peter finds he states the phrase..."Scrambled Eggs Super Dee Dooper Dee Booper Special Deluxe a la Peter T. Hooper".

Critical reception
Ruth C. Barlow of the Christian Science Monitor called it a "gay extravaganza".

It also received positive reviews from Chicago Sunday Tribune and The New York Herald Tribune for Seuss's illustrations of the birds.

Phillip Nel, in the book Dr. Seuss: American Icon, wrote that Scrambled Eggs Super! was one of Seuss's less politically oriented books.

Withdrawal
On March 2, 2021, Dr. Seuss Enterprises, the owner of the rights to Seuss's works, withdrew Scrambled Eggs Super! and five other books because they "portray people in ways that are hurtful and wrong". The possible scene perceived as "hurtful" is a two page illustration of five persons in a boat from a fictional location (named "Fa-Zoal") near the North Pole, wearing hooded fur parkas (i.e., the moustached white assistants seen elsewhere in the book in cold-weather gear), as these persons endeavored to collect eggs from fantastical birds called "Grice" which "lay eggs on the ice". After the books were removed, nine of the top ten, including the top four, books on Amazon's charts in the United States were Dr. Seuss books, though none were the books removed.  eBay, however, delisted the title for "offensive content".

References

1953 children's books
American children's books
American picture books
Stereotypes of Inuit people
Siblings in fiction
Books about birds
Eggs in culture
Race-related controversies in literature
Books by Dr. Seuss
Random House books